Chrysoritis, commonly called opals or coppers, is a genus of butterflies in the family Lycaenidae found mainly in southern Africa and particularly South Africa.

Species
Species of the genus include:

The chrysaor species group:
 Chrysoritis aethon (Trimen, 1887) – Lydenburg opal
 Chrysoritis aureus (van Son, 1966) – Heidelberg copper or golden opal
 Chrysoritis lycegenes (Trimen, 1874) – Mooi River opal
 Chrysoritis lyncurium (Trimen, 1868) – Tsomo River opal or Tsomo River copper
 Chrysoritis midas (Pennington, 1962) – Midas opal
 Chrysoritis natalensis (van Son, 1966) – Natal opal
 Chrysoritis phosphor (Trimen, 1866) – scarce scarlet or golden flash

The chrysantas species group:
Chrysoritis chrysantas (Trimen, 1868) – Karoo daisy copper

The oreas species group:
 Chrysoritis dicksoni (Gabriel, 1947) – Dickson's copper or Dickson's strandveld copper
 Chrysoritis oreas (Trimen, 1891) – Drakensberg copper or Drakensberg daisy copper

The pyroeis species group:
 Chrysoritis felthami (Trimen, 1904) – Feltham's opal
 Chrysoritis pyroeis (Trimen, 1864) – sand-dune opal

The thysbe species group:
 Chrysoritis adonis (Pennington, 1962) – Adonis opal
 Chrysoritis aridus (Pennington, 1953) – Namaqua opal
 Chrysoritis azurius (Swanepoel, 1975) – azure opal
 Chrysoritis beaufortius (Dickson, 1966) – Beaufort's opal
 Chrysoritis beulah (Quickelberge, 1966) – Beulah's opal
 Chrysoritis blencathrae (Heath & Ball, 1992) – Waaihoek opal
 Chrysoritis braueri (Pennington, 1967) – Brauer's opal
 Chrysoritis brooksi Riley, 1938 – Brook's opal
 Chrysoritis chrysaor (Trimen, 1864) – golden copper or burnished opal
 Chrysoritis daphne (Dickson, 1975) – Daphne's opal
 Chrysoritis endymion (Pennington, 1962) – Endymion opal
 Chrysoritis irene (Pennington, 1968) – Irene's opal
 Chrysoritis nigricans (Aurivillius, 1924) – dark opal
 Chrysoritis orientalis (Swanepoel, 1976) – eastern opal
 Chrysoritis palmus (Stoll, [1781]) – water opal
 Chrysoritis pan (Pennington, 1962) – Pan opal
 Chrysoritis pelion (Pennington, 1953) – Machacha opal
 Chrysoritis penningtoni (Riley, 1938) – Pennington's opal
 Chrysoritis perseus (Henning, 1977) – Perseus opal
 Chrysoritis plutus (Pennington, 1967) – Plutus opal
 Chrysoritis pyramus (Pennington, 1953) – Pyramus opal
 Chrysoritis rileyi (Dickson, 1966) – Riley's opal
 Chrysoritis swanepoeli (Dickson, 1965) – Swanepoel's opal
 Chrysoritis thysbe (Linnaeus, 1764) – opal copper or common opal
 Chrysoritis trimeni (Riley, 1938) – Trimen's opal
 Chrysoritis turneri (Riley, 1938) – Turner's opal
 Chrysoritis uranus (Pennington, 1962) – Uranus opal
 Chrysoritis violescens (Dickson, 1971) – violet opal

The zeuxo species group:
 Chrysoritis coetzeri Dickson & Wykeham, 1994 (may be included in C. zonarius)
 Chrysoritis cotrelli – Cotrell's daisy copper (may be included in C. zeuxo)
 Chrysoritis zeuxo (Linnaeus, 1764) – jitterbug daisy copper
 Chrysoritis zonarius (Riley, 1938) – donkey daisy copper

Poecilmitis
Formerly separated in genus Poecilmitis:
 Poecilmitis adonis now C. adonis
 Poecilmitis aureus now C. aureus
 Poecilmitis azurius now C. azurius
 Poecilmitis balli now C. pyramus balli
 Poecilmitis daphne now C. daphne
 Poecilmitis endymion now C. endymion
 Poecilmitis henningi now C. pan henningi
 Poecilmitis hyperion now C. swanepoeli hyperion
 Poecilmitis irene now C. irene
 Poecilmitis kaplani now C. beaufortius stepheni
 Poecilmitis lyncurium now C. lyncurium
 Poecilmitis lyndseyae now C. thysbe bamptoni
 Poecilmitis orientalis now C. orientalis
 Poecilmitis pan now C. pan
 Poecilmitis penningtoni now C. penningtoni
 Poecilmitis pyramus now C. pyramus
 Poecilmitis rileyi now C. rileyi
 Poecilmitis stepheni now C. beaufortius stepheni
 Poecilmitis swanepoeli now C. swanepoeli
 Poecilmitis trimeni now C. trimeni
 Poecilmitis wykehami now C. turneri wykehami

References

 
Butterflies of Africa
Lycaenidae genera
Taxa named by Arthur Gardiner Butler
Taxonomy articles created by Polbot